Turner Classic Movies, a movie-oriented network that was originally established as a cable channel in the United States, has expanded to include worldwide versions.

Canada
In Canada, Turner Classic Movies was debuted on November 1, 2005, on the Shaw Cable system and Shaw Direct satellite service. Rogers Cable started offering Turner Classic Movies on December 12, 2006, as a free preview channel for all digital customers, and added it to the "Ultimate TV" analogue package on or around February 1, 2007. While the schedule for the Canadian channel is generally the same as the US channel, some films are replaced for broadcast into Canada due to rights issues and other reasons.

Europe, the Middle East and Africa

In Europe, the Middle East and Africa, Turner Classic Movies was available as ten separate channels for Africa, Central and Eastern Europe, France/Switzerland/Belgium, Germany/Switzerland, Greece/Cyprus, Italy, Middle East, Nordic countries, Spain, the UK/Ireland/Malta, and a panregional channel with various feeds in different languages for the Nordic countries, Benelux and other countries.

While in Poland it was introduced in 1998 until October 6, 2015, as part of the WizjaTV platform along with a local version of Cartoon Network, the European feed was launched in 1999 until January 1, 2014, when its predecessor, the international version of TNT dropped its film programming to become a general entertainment channel. Its penetration increased when it took over TNT's space on various platforms in 1999 and 2000.

In Romania, Turner Classic Movies aired after Cartoon Network on the same channel from 10:00 PM, local time.

In the United Kingdom, Turner Classic Movies 2 launched on May 2, 2006. The channel, which is a spin-off from the UK version of Turner Classic Movies, Turner Classic Movies 2 focuses mainly on the bigger films from the MGM and Warner film archives including Citizen Kane, The Wizard of Oz, Casablanca, It Happened At The World's Fair, Speedway, North by Northwest and Meet Me in St. Louis, among others. The channel closed on August 12, 2013, and was replaced with Turner Classic Movies +1 on August 13, 2013

In December 2013, the pan-European channel closed in Portugal. In September 2013, Turner Broadcasting System revealed its plans to close down the pan-European channel for the Benelux market. The channel closed on 1 January 2014. On 1 June 2017, TCM Europe closed down in all of the Nordic countries. In August 2018, The MENA feed has dropped (Turner Classic Movies) tag and unveiled a new logo. The African TCM was rebranded to TNT in September 2018. In 2018, Greece has relaunched TCM again and was broadcasting on Cosmote, and broadcast in HD by 2019. In April 2019, TCM MENA became HD on beIN in the MENA Region. On 1 August 2019, Turner Classic Movies was rebranded to TCM Movies in United Kingdom.
Currently, TCM is only available in the UK and Ireland, Spain, France, Switzerland and Belgium and the Middle East, North Africa, Greece, and Cyprus.

Asia-Pacific

In Asia-Pacific, Turner Classic Movies was available as one feed that serves more than 14 territories. It was available in India until March 2, 2009, exclusively on Dish TV along with Boomerang. It is available in India on Tata Sky from August 2009 (Channel No. 357). It closed in January 2019.

Latin America

TCM was also available in Latin America, but this version receives little attention unlike the US and Europe, Middle East and Africa counterparts. This version in Latin America was called TCM Classic Hollywood until mid-2009.

Starting on April 1, 2009, TCM Latin America was renamed TCM Classic Entertainment and started airing most of the programming from the former channel Retro, also owned by Turner Broadcasting System, and which also aired classic series and movies. Its programming is aired on TCM as Retro has been replaced by truTV.

References

External links
 
 
 
 
 

Turner Classic Movies
Classic television networks